In law, coming into force or entry into force (also called commencement) is the process by which legislation, regulations, treaties and other legal instruments come to have legal force and effect. The term is closely related to the date of this transition. The point at which such instrument comes into effect may be set out in the instrument itself, or after the lapse of a certain period, or upon the happening of a certain event, such as a proclamation or an objective event, such as the birth, marriage, reaching a particular age or death of a certain person. On rare occasions, the effective date of a law may be backdated to a date before the enactment.

To come into force, a treaty or Act first needs to receive the required number of votes or ratifications. Although it is common practice to stipulate this number as a requirement in the body of the treaty itself, it can also be set out in a superior law or legal framework, such as a constitution or the standing orders of the legislature in which it originated.

Coming into force generally includes publication in an official gazette so that people know the law or treaty exists.

Treaties 

After their adoption, treaties as well as their amendments may have to follow the official legal procedures of the organisation, such as the United Nations, that sponsored it, including signature, ratification, and entry into force.

Acts

The process of enactment, by which a bill becomes an Act, is separate from commencement. Even if a bill passes through all necessary stages to become an Act, it may not automatically come into force. Moreover, an Act may be repealed having never come into force.

A country's law could determine that on being passed by lawmakers a bill becomes an act without further ado. However, more usually, the process whereby a bill becomes an Act is well prescribed in general constitutional or administrative legislation. This process varies from country to country, and from political system to political system.

Typically, the process by which a bill becomes an Act includes signature or some other token of assent by the head of state and publication in an official gazette. In some systems, the head of state or some other official is required to definitely signify his approval, as for example in the granting of royal assent in the Commonwealth realms. In others, a bill automatically becomes an Act unless vetoed, as for example in the United States. But these steps do not, in themselves, make an act legally binding on the population. An act is typically brought into force in one of three ways:
 By means of an explicit commencement date (and sometimes time of day) written into the act itself. It is possible for different sections of an act to come into force at different dates or times.
 As a result of a commencement order. Usually, an Act or part of an Act may only be brought into force by a commencement order if explicit provision is made. Commencement orders are typically issued by the executive branch of government, though they may also require legislative approval, or at least that the legislature be informed. As with explicit commencement dates, different parts of an act may be brought into force by different commencement orders at different times.
 Automatically. An Act that does not include explicit commencement dates or provision for commencement orders, or that has dates or provides for commencement orders for only some of its contents, will typically be interpreted as having come into effect at a certain time relative to its enactment. This time is usually specified by an interpretive statute, or, in the absence of such a statute, a legal rule. For example, in the United Kingdom, until late in the 18th century a legal rule interpreted statutes as coming into effect at the start of the legislative session in which they were passed, but Acts of Parliament (Commencement) Act 1793 stipulated that future laws without explicit commencement provisions would come into effect on the day on which they received royal assent. A similar example is provided by New Zealand, where an Act without commencement provisions comes into force on the day after the day on which it received royal assent.
 It is possible for an Act to come into effect through any combination of these three methods.

It is not necessarily the case that a statute which comes into force remains in force until it is repealed; it may be explicitly brought out of force, and perhaps later brought back into force. For example, in Ireland, Section V of the Offences against the State Act 1939 (which provides for the Special Criminal Court) goes in and out of force by government proclamation: it was brought into force on 24 August 1939, out of force on 2 October 1962, and back into force on 26 May 1972.

United Kingdom
Section 4 of the Interpretation Act 1978 provides:

This replaces the corresponding provision in the Acts of Parliament (Commencement) Act 1793.

Schedule 1 of that Act contains the following definition:

Northern Ireland
Sections 14(1) and (2) of the Interpretation Act (Northern Ireland) 1954 read:

In an enactment the expression "commencement", when used with reference to any statutory provision, means the time at which that provision comes into operation.

Scotland

Sections 2 and 3 of the Interpretation and Legislative Reform (Scotland) Act 2010, which applies to Acts of the Scottish Parliament and Scottish Statutory Instruments, provide-

This replaces the temporary provision made by the Scotland Act 1998 (Transitory and Transitional Provisions) (Publication and Interpretation etc. of Acts of the Scottish Parliament) Order 1999.

References

See also 

 Effective date
 List of enacting clauses
 Act of Congress
 Rule of law
 Vacatio legis

 Legal terminology